Cullen may refer to:

Places

Canada
Cullen, Saskatchewan, a former hamlet in Benson No. 35 Rural Municipality

Ireland
Cullen, County Cork, a village near Boherbue, County Cork
Cullen, County Tipperary, a small village in County Tipperary

Scotland
Cullen, Moray, a village in Moray

United States
Cullen, Kentucky
Cullen, Louisiana, a town in Webster Parish
Cullen, New York, a hamlet in the town of Warren
Cullen, Virginia
Cullen, Wisconsin, an unincorporated community in Oconto County

People
 Cullen (surname), an Irish surname (includes a list)
 Cullen Baker (1835–1869), American criminal
 Cullen Bunn (born 1971), American writer
 Cullen Finnerty (1982–2013), American football player
 Cullen Gillaspia (born 1995), American football player
 Cullen Hightower (1923–2008), American writer
 Cullen Jenkins (born 1981), American football player
 Cullen Jones (born 1984), American swimmer
 Cullen Landis (1896–1975), American actor and director
 Cullen Rogers (1921–1997), American football player
Cullen Washington, Jr. (born 1972) American abstract painter

Fictional entities
 Cullen Bohannon, the protagonist of the Hell on Wheels (TV series)
 Cullen Rutherford, a recurring character in the Dragon Age series
 Cullen family of vampires, in the Twilight series by Stephenie Meyer
 Cullen Virus, a fictional virus in "Berlin", an episode of The Blacklist

Other uses
 Cullen Center in Houston, Texas
Cullen (plant), a genus of legumes native to the Old World
Cullen College of Engineering, an academic college at the University of Houston
Cullen number, a natural number of the form n · 2n + 1 (written Cn)
Cullen skink, a thick Scottish soup
Cullen Wines, a winery in Western Australia

See also

Cullen's sign, blue-black bruising of the area around the umbilicus
Culen (disambiguation)
Kullen (disambiguation)